Dipankar Basu was an Indian career banker who served as the fifteenth Chairman of the State Bank of India.

Life 

He was born on 10 August 1935.

He was born and raised in the Indian city of Kolkata.

He died on 15 February 2018 in Kolkata.

Education 

He held a master's degree in Economics from Delhi University.

Career

Early career 

He joined the State Bank of India as a probationary officer in 1956 and served in a number of roles until finally becoming the Chairman of State Bank of India in 1993.

Banking career 

He served as the fifteenth Chairman of State Bank of India from 25 February 1993 until 31 August 1995.

He was largely responsible for the bank's entry into the investment banking and mutual fund businesses and was instrumental in setting up SBI Capital Markets Ltd. and SBI Mutual Fund.

After his retirement in 1995, he was succeeded by P. G. Kakodkar as the Chairman of the State Bank of India.

Later career 

After having retired from the State Bank of India in 1995, he was appointed as the non-executive chairman of the Sun Foreign & Colonial Asset Management, which is currently a subsidiary of the Principal Financial Group.

He was nominated by the Securities and Exchange Board of India to serve as a director of the Calcutta Stock Exchange.

References

External links 

 Official Biography
 Official Website
 SBI chairmen
 SBI history

Indian bankers
State Bank of India
Chairmen of the State Bank of India
Indian corporate directors
People from Kolkata
1935 births
2018 deaths